On May 4, 2018, an earthquake with a magnitude of  6.9 struck Hawaii island in the Hawaii archipelago at around 12:33 p.m. local time. The earthquake's epicenter was near the south flank of Kīlauea, which has been the site of seismic and volcanic activity since late April of that year. According to the United States Geological Survey the quake was related to the new lava outbreaks at the volcano, and it resulted in the Hilina Slump moving about two feet. It was the largest earthquake to affect Hawaii since the 1975 earthquake, which affected the same region, killing two people and injuring another 28.

The earthquake had a maximum strength on the Mercalli intensity scale of VIII (Severe). The earthquake was preceded by a smaller event, measuring 5.4, that was felt across the island and as far away as Oahu.

The earthquake produced a minor tsunami that reached a maximum height of 40 cm (15.7 in.) in Kapoho, 20 cm (7.9 in.) in Hilo and 15 cm (5.9 in.) in Honuapo.

Tectonic setting 
Hawaii island is affected by a large number of minor earthquakes related to the movement of magma beneath its active volcanoes. Additionally there are less frequent tectonic earthquakes that are caused either by faulting within the volcanoes or by slip along the basal detachment surface at the top of the oceanic crust associated with the gradual collapse of the island's flanks as it continues to be enlarged. Near Kilauea volcano, the largest structure formed by the collapse of the southeastern flank of the island is the Hilina slump.

Earthquake 
The main earthquake was preceded almost exactly an hour earlier by a  5.4 foreshock with a similar epicenter and focal mechanism. Analysis of seismic waveforms suggest that the mainshock was most likely caused by slip on a thrust fault dipping at 20° to the northwest beneath the southeastern flank of the volcano. The mainshock was followed by four aftershocks greater than  4.5 over the next 30 minutes. Smaller aftershock continued to occur for months after the main earthquake.

Further analysis of Love waves, whose radiation pattern gives greater discrimination on low-angle dips, indicate that the rupture occurred on a plane dipping at about 7°, consistent with it happening at the base of the Hawaiian volcanic rocks, where they overlie sedimentary rocks on the earlier seafloor. The calculated low rupture speed is also consistent with propagation along a relatively weak zone. This would make it similar to the 1975 Kalapana earthquake.

Damage 
The quake damaged many buildings, caused landslides that damaged shorelines, and caused cracks in a road, causing it to be shut down.

See also 

 List of earthquakes in 2018
 List of earthquakes in the United States
 List of earthquakes in Hawaii
 2018 lower Puna eruption

References

External links 
 

2018 earthquakes
2018 in Hawaii
Earthquakes in Hawaii
May 2018 events in the United States
May 2018 events in Oceania
2018 tsunamis